Léon Omer Beaugendre (9 September 1883 – 20 April 1954) was a French cyclist who competed at the 1900 Summer Olympics in Paris and in the 1910 Tour de France. He won Paris–Tours in 1908. He was the brother of the cyclists François Beaugendre and Joseph Beaugendre.

References

External links

1883 births
1954 deaths
French male cyclists
Olympic cyclists of France
Cyclists at the 1900 Summer Olympics
Sportspeople from Loir-et-Cher
Cyclists from Centre-Val de Loire